Jimmy Gordon may refer to:
Jimmy Gordon (Australian rules footballer) (1896–1918), Australian rules footballer for Essendon
Jimmy Gordon (footballer, born 1886) (1886–1959), English football player (West Ham, Grimsby Town)
Jimmy Gordon (footballer, born 1888) (1888–1954), Scottish football player (Rangers, Scotland)
Jimmy Gordon (footballer, born 1915) (1915–1996), Scottish football player (Newcastle, Middlesbrough) and coach (Derby, Leeds, Nottingham Forest)

See also 
 James Gordon (disambiguation)